Sapphire is a rock album by John Martyn, who by this stage in his career had almost entirely abandoned the acoustic guitar and folk approach in favour of a glossy pop/rock sound.

Recorded at Compass Point Studios, Nassau, Bahamas and CaVa Sound Workshops, Glasgow, Scotland, the album was originally released on LP by Island in 1984, catalogue number ILPS 9779, with photography by Anton Corbijn and a cover illustration by Cathie Felstead.

Robert Palmer assisted in the later stages of the recording and the LP liner notes acknowledge his help: "An extra special thank you to Robert Palmer without whose help this album may never have been made."

Track listing
All tracks composed by John Martyn except where indicated.

"Sapphire" 4:42
"Over The Rainbow" (Harold Arlen, Yip Harburg) 3:21 
"You Know" 3:14
"Watching Her Eyes" 3:15
"Fisherman's Dream" 4:16 
"Acid Rain" (Martyn, Alan Thomson) 4:11 
"Mad Dog Days" (Martyn, Alan Thomson) 4:59
"Climb The Walls" 4:14
"Coming In On Time" 3:34 
"Rope-Soul'd" (Martyn, Alan Thomson, Barry Reynolds) 4:46

Personnel
John Martyn - guitars, vocals, LinnDrum
Barry Reynolds - guitar
Alan Thomson - bass guitar, keyboards, LinnDrum
Jack Waldman - keyboards
Jim Prime - keyboards
Robin Rankin - keyboards
James Hooker - keyboards
Steven Stanley - LinnDrum
Andy Lyden - LinnDrum
Uziah Thompson - percussion
Colin Tully - saxophones
Morwenne Laidlaw - vocal harmonies
Terry Neason - vocal harmonies
Lorna Brooks - vocal harmonies
Cathie Felstead - cover illustration
Anton Corbijn - photography

Choral section by S.N.O. arranged by Dave Murricane.

References

External links
The Official John Martyn Website

John Martyn albums
1984 albums
Island Records albums